Esteban Cabeza de Baca was born in 1985 in San Ysidro, California, and received a BFA from Cooper Union, School of the Arts in 2010 and an MFA from Columbia University in 2014. He currently lives and works in Queens, New York.

Biography

Early life
Cabeza de Baca's childhood hometown of San Ysidro was located on the U.S.–Mexico border. His father and mother were active in the Brown Berets, as well as the Chicano, American Indian, and Black Panther movements. Cabeza de Baca was heavily influenced by the border town's position, as well as his Native American and Mexican heritage. He was also influenced by his parents, whose political passions and concern for human dignity led them to shelter "illegals" in their home during his youth.

Artistic style
Cabeza de Baca employs disparate painterly techniques in his work, mixing graffiti, landscape, and pre-Columbian pictographs—confounding Cartesian single-point perspective. His influences extend from petroglyphs to Jackson Pollock, who was in turn influenced by Navajo sand painting. "I want to excavate the impact of colonial acts like that," says Cabeza de Baca. "To go farther with the drip than Pollock did and collide the infinite with the everyday."

Cabeza de Baca regularly begins his works en plein air, recasting the act of landscape painting, that was a favored surveying tool of colonizers. In Tsankawi (2018), the artist depicts the Bandelier National Monument in New Mexico viewed from a Pueblo cave. Spray paint traverses the picture’s layers, forming abstractions that recall characters from Rembrandt's The Blinding of Samson. A spiral wall carving drifts from the cave's walls into the center of the canvas, disrupting perspectival cohesion, and foregrounding the eternal form. Among other things, Cabeza de Baca's complex techniques and influences reveal the dialectical dynamics between colonialism and its critique.

Awards
Cabeza de Baca has received numerous grants and awards including, a Robert Gamblin Painting Grant (2013); a Stern Fellowship, Columbia University (2013); a Sharpe-Walentas Studio Program Award (2014); a Stokroos Foundation Grant (2017); and a Henk en Victoria de Heus Fellowship (2018).

Exhibitions
His work has been the subject of numerous solo exhibitions, such as: Bluer Than a Sky Weeping Bones, Gaa Gallery, (2016, Provincetown, MA); Unlearn, Fons Welters Gallery, (2018, Amsterdam); Verano, with Heidi Howard, Gaa Gallery, (2018, Wellfleet, MA); Esteban Cabeza de Baca, Gaa Projects (2019, Cologne); Worlds without Borders, Boers-Li Gallery (2019, New York); and Es­teban Cabeza de Baca – Life is one drop in limitless oceans … , Kunstfort Vijfhuizen, (2019, Amsterdam). He has participated in over 15 group exhibitions at venues such as the Leroy Neiman Art Center (2014, 2015, New York), the Yale University School of Sacred Music (2017, New Haven, CT), the Dutch Royal Palace (2018, Amsterdam, Netherlands), and the Drawing Center (2019, New York), among others.

Further reading
 Gaa Gallery. Josephine Halvorson + Esteban Cabeza de Baca: Correspondences. Provincetown: Gaa Gallery, 2021.
https://brooklynrail.org/2022/05/art/Esteban-Cabeza-de-Baca-with-Colin-Edgington

References

External links
Official site
Garth Greenan Gallery

21st-century American painters
Native American painters
1985 births
Living people
Cooper Union alumni
Columbia University School of the Arts alumni